The Paderborn Dolphins are an American football team from Paderborn, Germany.

The club's greatest success has been promotion, in 1997, to the American football Bundesliga, now the German Football League, where it played for two seasons until 1999.

After winning the GFL 2 North in 2022, the Dolphins will return to the top level of Germany in 2023 the German Football League for the first time since 1999.

History
The Dolphins entered league football in 1992 when they joined the tier-four Verbandsliga. The club spent two seasons at this level before earning promotion to the Regionalliga, where it played until 1995. After promotion from the Regionalliga to the 2nd Bundesliga the Dolphins finished sixth in the league in 1996 before winning its division in 1997 led by USA Import quarterback Bradly Strohm. In the promotion round the club defeated Bundesliga foundation club Berlin Adler, ending the latter's nineteen-season stint in the league since 1979.

In the Bundesliga the Dolphins' sole victory in the 1998 season came away at the Stuttgart Scorpions in an interconference match but the club defended its league place in the relegation round against 2. Bundesliga club Berlin Rebels. The season after, playing as AFC Paderborn, the club's results were stricken from the table after it found itself unable to complete its fixtures and was consequently relegated.

The club, again as the Dolphins, returned to the tier-three Regionalliga from 2000 onwards, playing the next three seasons at that level. At the end of the 2002 season it withdrew from league football and restarted again in the Verbandsliga in 2004. Two unbeaten seasons in 2004 and 2005 took the team back to the Regionalliga, where it played for the next nine seasons from 2006 to 2014. It won league championships at this level in 2008 and 2014, remaining unbeaten on both occasions. In 2008 it missed out on promotion when it lost to the Hildesheim Invaders in the promotion round but, in 2014, a draw against the Osnabrück Tigers followed by victory over the Potsdam Royals took the club back to the second tier after a fourteen-year absence.

In 2015, the team finished third in the German Football League 2, the former 2nd Bundesliga.

Honours
 Bundesliga
 League membership: (2) 1998–1999
 2. Bundesliga
 Northern division champions: 1997, 2022

Recent seasons
Recent seasons of the club:

 RR = Relegation round
 PR = Promotion round
 QF = Quarter finals
 SF = Semi finals

References

External links
  Official website
  German Football League official website
  Football History Historic American football tables from Germany

American football teams in Germany
German Football League teams
American football teams established in 1991
1991 establishments in Germany
Dolphins